Maxim Sergeyevich Eprev (born December 3, 1988) is a Russian professional ice hockey defenceman who currently plays for Dynamo Moscow in the Kontinental Hockey League.

References

External links

1988 births
Living people
HC Vityaz players
People from Podolsk
Russian ice hockey defencemen
Sportspeople from Moscow Oblast